Salbari Railway Station serves the town of Salbari, near River Jaldhaka, Alipurduar district in the Indian state of West Bengal.
The station lies on the New Jalpaiguri–New Bongaigaon section of Barauni–Guwahati line of Northeast Frontier Railway. This station falls under Alipurduar railway division.

References

Alipurduar railway division
Railway stations in West Bengal
Railway stations in Alipurduar district